Lillian Hutchings was a female English international table tennis player.

She won a bronze medal at the 1937 World Table Tennis Championships in the women's doubles with Stefanie Werle.

See also
 List of England players at the World Team Table Tennis Championships
 List of World Table Tennis Championships medalists

References

English female table tennis players
World Table Tennis Championships medalists